Sylvain Derome Monsoreau (born 20 March 1981) is a French retired professional footballer who played as a central defender. While at Sochaux he played as they won the 2004 Coupe de la Ligue Final. Monsoreau scored Sochaux's goal as they drew 1–1 with Nantes, before winning on penalties.

Honours
Sochaux
 Coupe de la Ligue: 2004

Lyon
 Trophée des Champions: 2005
 Ligue 1: 2005–06

References

External links 
 
 

Living people
1981 births
People from Saint-Cyr-l'École
Footballers from Yvelines
Association football defenders
French footballers
FC Sochaux-Montbéliard players
Olympique Lyonnais players
AS Monaco FC players
AS Saint-Étienne players
ES Troyes AC players
ATK (football club) draft picks
Ligue 1 players
Ligue 2 players
French expatriate footballers
French expatriate sportspeople in India
Expatriate footballers in India